Sadotti is a surname. Notable people with the surname include:

Giorgio Sadotti (born 1955), British conceptual artist
Mirco Sadotti (born 1975), Italian footballer